Alireza Marzban (born 26 May 1958 in Azna) is an Iranian football manager. He works as an assistant in Sepahan in Persian Gulf Pro League.

Early life
He was born on 26 May 1958 in Azna from an Iranian father and an Iranian mother. He was moved to Germany in 1995 to study in a university in Munich.

Coaching career

After graduating from university, he began working at 1.FC Eschborn as a chief scout. Two years later, he became the team's assistant coach and was promoted as the team manager in 2001, a post he kept until 2004. In July 2005, he was appointed as the manager of KSV Baunatal but was sacked at the end of the season. After Afshin Ghotbi appointed as head coach of Persepolis, he was named as one of his assistants, alongside he worked as fitness trainer at the club. After resignation of Ghotbi, he left the team to become DAC Dunajská Streda's assistant coach. He also works with Hamid Estili as his assistant in Steel Azin. He was Montenegro national football team's assistant to Zlatko Kranjčar from 2009 until 2010. After Kranjčar became head coach of Sepahan in November 2011, he was named as his first team coach. He left the team after a series of problems with the management in December 2012. He has worked in IRIB's Varzesh channel as a football analyst. On 15 August 2013, he became assistant coach of Akbar Misaghian at Azadegan League side Padideh Shandiz. After Misaghian resigned despite promoting Padideh to the Iran Pro League, Marzban was named as his successor.

Statistics

Honours

Assistant Manager
1.FC Eschborn
Hessen-Mitte: 2000 (Runner-up)

Persepolis
Iran Pro League (1): 2007–08

Sepahan
Iran Pro League (1): 2011–12

Padideh
Azadegan League (1): 2013–14

Manager
1.FC Eschborn
Hessenliga (1): 2003
Hessen-Mitte: 2001 (Runner-up)

Paykan
Azadegan League (1): 2015–16

Individual
IFCA Best Azadegan League Manager (1): 2015–16

References

1958 births
Living people
Iranian football managers
Persepolis F.C. non-playing staff
People from Lorestan Province
Shahr Khodro F.C. managers